"Normal" is a song by American rapper Eminem from his tenth studio album Kamikaze. It was released as the album's fifth track on August 31, 2018 via Shady Records along with the rest of the album. Recording sessions took place at Effigy Studios in Detroit. Produced by Illadaproducer, Symbolyc One and Lonestarrmuzik, the song contains samples from Little Dragon's song "Seconds". Despite never being released as a single, the song has managed to chart worldwide.

The rapper speaks about a volatile, mutually toxic relationship that throws several parallels to the hit single "Love the Way You Lie". He raps in the song's opening: "I love you but I hope you fuckin' die tho". Tom Breihan of Stereogum wrote: "Eminem freaks out on an on-and-off girlfriend, accusing her of cheating or of getting back at him by dressing sexy when she goes out. He complains that she’s being “extra, like a fuckin’ terrestrial”. As the song progresses, he's rapping about putting tracking devices on her car or hitting her with a baseball bat. And that's where the plausible deniability comes in. Em's exaggerating things to ridiculous extents, so we know he's making dark jokes, not being serious. It's the most poisonous form of self-awareness, the kind that just dares you to get offended or triggered".

Personnel
Marshall Mathers – main artist, vocals, mixing, songwriter
Ray Fraser – producer, songwriter
Larry Griffin Jr. – producer, songwriter
Maurice Nichols – producer, songwriter
Ricky Sheldon – additional producer, songwriter
Mike Strange – recording, mixing
Joe Strange – recording
Tony Campana – recording

Charts

Certifications

References

2018 songs
Eminem songs
Songs written by Eminem
Songs written by Symbolyc One
Song recordings produced by Symbolyc One